Project Runway Season 16 is the sixteenth season of the television show Project Runway, appearing on Lifetime. The season began on Thursday, August 17, 2017. There are 16 designers competing to become "the next great American designer." Supermodel Heidi Klum, Marie Claire creative director Nina Garcia, and fashion designer Zac Posen are all returning as judges this season. Tim Gunn maintains his role as the workroom mentor. This was the last season to air on Lifetime and the last to feature Klum, Gunn, and Posen.

Season 16 was the first time the show emphasized diversity and inclusivity in the size of its models, who ranged from sizes 0 to 22.

Designers

 Batani was originally eliminated after Shawn, but returned to the competition following Claire's disqualification.

Designer Progress

: Claire and Shawn were the losing team, but the judges were unable to decide whom to eliminate, so they were tasked with creating a look in one hour to decide who is eliminated. Shawn forfeited the challenge to Claire and was eliminated.
: Claire won the challenge but was caught breaking the rules and was disqualified. The losing designer, Batani, was spared elimination. Due to Claire's disqualification, the winning designer was Brandon. His print will be available on coffee cups.
: Samantha was given positive critique despite being in a losing team.

 The designer won Project Runway Season 16.
 The designer advanced to Fashion Week.
 The designer won the challenge.
 The designer came in second but did not win the challenge.
 The designer had one of the highest scores for that challenge, but did not win.
 The designer had one of the lowest scores for that challenge, but was not eliminated.
 The designer was in the bottom two, but was not eliminated.
 The designer lost and was eliminated from the competition.
 The designer lost, but was brought back to the competition by Tim Gunn.
 The designer was disqualified from the competition.
 The designer withdrew from the competition.

Model Progress

: In episode 8, the designers had other clients as their models.

 The model was paired with the winning designer of Project Runway Season 16.
 The model wore the design that advanced the designer to fashion week.
  The model wore the winning design.  
 The model wore the design with the second-highest score.  
  The model wore the design with one of the highest scores but did not win.  
  The model wore the design with one of the lowest scores. 
 The model wore the design that landed in the bottom 2.  
  The model wore the losing design.  
 The model was eliminated.

Model Assignments 

Designer Legend
Aaron Myers: AM
Amy Bond: AB
Ayana Ife: AI
Batani-Khalfani: BT
Brandon Kee: BK
ChaCha: CC
Claire Buitendorp: CB
Deyonté Weather: DW
Kentaro Kameyama: KT
Kenya Freeman: KF
Kudzanai Karidza: KD
Margarita Alvarez: MA
Michael Brambila: MB
Samantha Rei: SR
Sentell McDonald: SM
Shawn Buitendorp: SB

Episodes 
Sources:

Episode 0: Road to the Runway 
Original airdate: August 10, 2017
(présentation des candidats)

Episode 1: One Size Does Not Fit All 
Original airdate: August 17, 2017

The designers enter Season 16 in style as they must create a red carpet look that demonstrates their fashion point of view. But the real surprise comes when the designers learn they will be working with models of all sizes!

 Challenge: Create a red carpet look with your own signature style. 
 Guest Judge: Olivia Munn 
 WINNER: Deyonté 
 ELIMINATED: ChaCha

Episode 2: An Unconventional Recycling 
Original airdate: August 24, 2017

In their first team challenge, the designers struggle to make their voices heard. However, this is an unconventional materials challenge and many of them stumble when forced to create a fashion forward look out of recyclable materials.

 Challenge: Create a high fashion mini collection from recycled materials. 
 Guest Judge: Maggie Q &  Anne Fulenwider
 WINNER: Ayana
 ELIMINATED: Sentell

Episode 3: A Leap of Innovation! 
Original airdate: August 31, 2017

The designers are treated to a private screening of the film Leap! as well as a performance by Hiplet and must draw inspiration for an innovative and edgy design in order to survive another week.

 Challenge: Create a look inspired by dance, movement and innovation.
 Guest Judge: Maddie Ziegler
 WINNER: Brandon
 ELIMINATED: Kudzanai

Episode 4: We're Sleeping Wear? 
Original airdate: September 7, 2017

It’s the Heidi Klum Sleepwear Challenge and the designers are feeling on top of the world, literally. If a slumber party on the roof of the Empire State Building doesn’t bring them the inspiration they need to impress Heidi, nothing will!

 Challenge: Create a sleepwear look for Heidi Klum Intimates.
 Guest Judge: Demi Lovato
 WINNER: Michael
 ELIMINATED: Deyonté

Episode 5: Descending into Good and Evil 
Original airdate: September 14, 2017

Drawing inspiration from the hit film Descendants 2, the designers visit Lyndhurst Castle and are tasked with creating a look that represents “Good” or “Evil.” Most of the results are angelic, but as always, the devil is in the details.

 Challenge: Create an evening wear look inspired by good or evil.
 Guest Judge: Dove Cameron & China Anne McClain
 WINNER: Brandon
 ELIMINATED: Aaron

Episode 6: Models Off Duty 
Original airdate: September 21, 2017

The models become much more than runway eye candy as they serve for inspiration to the designers to create a street style look, to be featured in a photo shoot. But ceding creative control to the models proves to be a difficult chore for some designers.

 Challenge: Create a streetwear look for models on their day off. 
 Guest Judge: Georgina Chapman & Kelsea Ballerini
 WINNER: Kentaro
 ELIMINATED: Samantha

Episode 7: The Ultimate Faceoff 
Original airdate: September 28, 2017

It’s the JC Penney Challenge and the designers must use men’s fabrics and designs to create a fashion forward look for their female models. Not only that, they must work in teams to do it, leading to a runway elimination that no one saw coming!

 Challenge: Create a stylish fall outfit inspired by menswear. 
 Guest Judge: Asia Kate Dillon
 WINNER: Margarita
 ELIMINATED:  Shawn
In a twist, after Claire and Shawn are declared the losing team, they are given one hour to create all-new looks, in competition against each other. Shawn forfeited the challenge and was eliminated.

Episode 8: Client on the Go 
Original airdate: October 5, 2017

The designers are tasked with creating an on-the-go look for friends and family of the Project Runway crew, but the good spirited challenge takes an ugly turn when accusations of cheating cloud the results of a contentious runway.

 Challenge: Create a print and head-to-toe look. 
 Guest Judge: Sophia Stallone & Yolanda Hadid
 DISQUALIFIED: Claire
 Claire was disqualified for breaking the rules and her win was rescinded. Although Brandon's print was announced to be put into print for Dixie cups, there was no replacement winner for the challenge and Batani was spared elimination.

Episode 9: A "Little" Avant Garde 
Original airdate: October 12, 2017

The dramatic fallout from the cheating scandal rocks the designers and leaves everyone wondering how they’ll move forward in the competition. But the show must go on and the designers rally to create an Avant Garde look inspired by Shopkins characters.

 Challenge: Create an avant garde look inspired by Shopkins Shoppies. 
 Guest Judge: Kate Upton
 WINNER: Michael
 ELIMINATED: Batani & Amy

Episode 10: Driving Miss Unconventional 
Original airdate: October 19, 2017

It’s the Lexus Challenge, but this one is Unconventional and nobody is safe! The designers must use safety materials to create a look that wows the judges as Fashion Week is right around the corner.

 Challenge: Create a runway look using unconventional materials.
 Guest Judge: Carly Chaikin
 WINNER: Ayana
 ELIMINATED: Michael

Episode 11: Warrior Fashion 
Original airdate: October 26, 2017

It’s an emotional Runway as the designers create looks inspired by “Warrior Women” — women who have battled breast cancer.

 Challenge: Create an editorial look inspired by Warrior Women. 
 Guest Judge: Rachel Brosnahan
 WINNER: Brandon
 SAVED: Margarita

Episode 12: There's Snow Business like Sew Business 
Original airdate: November 2, 2017

The runway is converted into a Winter Wonderland as the designers are tasked with creating a winter-themed look that will decide who goes to NY Fashion Week and who gets left out in the cold.

 Challenge: Create a high fashion winter look.
 Guest Judge: Katie Holmes
 ADVANCED TO FASHION WEEK: Kentaro, Brandon, Ayana, Margarita, & Kenya
 ELIMINATED: None

Episode 13: Finale Part 1 
Original airdate: November 9, 2017

After heading home to work on their Fashion Week collections, the five finalists are visited by Tim who is not impressed with everything they have created so far. The designers return to New York and present the judges with 2 pieces from their collection. With only four designers remaining for the second part of the finale, everything is on the line.

 Challenge: Present two pieces from your final collection.
 ADVANCED TO FASHION WEEK: Brandon, Ayana, Margarita, Kentaro
 ELIMINATED: Kenya

Episode 14: Finale Part 2 
Original airdate: November 16, 2017

Fashion week is finally here and the designers rush to put the final touches on their collections. Four designers will have their dream of showing at New York Fashion Week, but only one designer will reach the ultimate goal of being crowned the next Project Runway Winner!

 Challenge: Present a 10-piece final collection at New York Fashion Week. 
 Guest Judge: Jessica Alba
 WINNER: Kentaro
 ELIMINATED: Ayana (2nd Place), Brandon (3rd Place), Margarita (4th Place)

Episode 15: Season 16 Reunion Special 
Original airdate: November 30, 2017

The season 16 designers reunite with mentor Tim Gunn to discuss their Project Runway experience. They come ready to reminisce, share emotions, and get to the bottom of the cheating scandal that rocked the season. And some of our favorite models also swing by!

References

External links 
 Project Runway Season 16 Official Website 
 
 JustFab's website

Season 15
2017 American television seasons
2016 in fashion